Philipose Mar Chrysostom Mar Thoma XX Valiya Metropolitan, (born Philip Oommen; 27 April 1918 – 5 May 2021) was an Indian prelate who served as Metropolitan of the Malankara Mar Thoma Syrian Church from 1999-2007 and Valiya Thirumeni (Metropolitan Emeritus) from 2007 until his death. He was addressed and referred to as Chrysostom Thirumeni or Valiya Thirumeni after his retirement. He was awarded India's third highest civilian award, the Padma Bhushan, in 2018.

Early life and education
Philip Oommen was born to the Adangappurathu Kalamannil family which is a part of the Shankarapuri family one of the oldest aristocratic brahmin family converted by Thomas the Apostle which has produced several priests. Tirumeni's father was Vicar General K. E. Oommen, Kalamannil, Adangapurathu, Kumbanad, Thiruvalla. His mother was Sosamma of Nadukke Veettil, Karthikappally.

He attended Maramon, Kozhencherry and Eraviperoor schools, and went on to graduate from Union Christian College, Aluva. He was ordained as a deacon of the Malankara Mar Thoma Church on 1 January 1944 and Kasseessa on 3 June 1944. He was ordained as Ramban on 20 May 1952.

Consecration
In 1950 the Church Mandalam [ Sabha Pratinidhi Mandalam ] (representative assembly) consecrated three bishops, including Philip Oommen. On 23 May 1953, Philip Oommen Ramban was consecrated as Philipose Mar Chrysostom Episcopa.  During his tenure he was the president of the National Council of Churches, India and attended World Council of Churches at Evanston in 1954 and Uppsala in 1968. He also attended the Second Vatican Council.

Status metropolitan

Episcopa

On 23 May 1953, Juhanon Mar Thoma Metropolitan assisted by Mathews Mar Athanasius Episcopa ordained Oommen as Episcopa and gave him the episcopal title Philipose Mar Chrysostom. M. G. Chandy (Alexander Mar Theophilus later Alexander Mar Thoma ) and P.Thomas (Thomas Mar Athanasius) were ordained on the same day.

In 1954, Mar Chrysostom joined St. Augustine's College, Canterbury, UK to further his theological studies.

Suffragan Metropolitan

He was designated as Suffragan Metropolitan in May 1978.

Officiating Metropolitan

After Alexander Mar Thoma Metropolitan stepped aside from the daily administration of the church due to ill-health on 15 March 1999, Mar Chrysostom was designated Officiating Metropolitan.

Metropolitan

Mar Chrysostom was installed as Metropolitan on 23 October 1999 when Alexander Mar Thoma Metropolitan was made Valiya Metropolitan. (Senior Metropolitan)

Valiya Metropolitan ( Metropolitan Emeritus)

On 28 August 2007, Thirumeni announced his resignation as supreme head of the Malankara Mar Thoma Syrian Church on grounds of old age and ill-health

Biopic 
Indian film director Blessy made a comprehensive biopic called 100 years of Chrysostom, about 48 hours 10 minute long, on Philipose Mar Chrysostom.

Navathy Home Project
Philipose Mar Chrysostom Mar Thoma Metropolitan completed 90 years on 27 April 2008. As part of the birthday celebration, Mar Thoma Church devised a project, Navathy Home Project, to support and enable 1500 families in India, irrespective of caste, creed or religion, to build a home of their own. (Malayalam – navathy – ninetieth anniversary). The cost of each home was Rs. 1,50,000. (US$2400). Each house consisted of a sit-out, a drawing room, a bedroom, a kitchen, a dining room and a toilet. Mar Thoma Church members donated so much that the project was a great success; it was extended from India to Mexico.

Centenary
On his hundredth birthday, on 27 April 2018, the church officially inaugurated the Project among the Transgender Community.

Padma Bhushan

The Republic of India awarded the Padma Bhushan to Tirumeni for services to society. It was officially declared on the eve of Republic Day 2018 and he was awarded on 20 March 2018.

Death
Tirumeni died on 5 May 2021 at his residence soon after being hospitalized. He died of natural causes.

See also
 Throne of St. Thomas
 Syrian Malabar Nasrani
 Saint Thomas Christians
 Christianity in India
 List of Syrian Malabar Nasranis
 Joseph Mar Thoma

References

Mar Thoma Church.

Further reading
Eapen, K. V. (2001). Malankara Marthoma Suryani Sabha Charitram. (History of Malankara Marthoma Syrian Church). Pub: Kallettu, Muttambalam, Kottayam.
Mathew, N. M. Malankara Marthoma Sabha Charitram, (History of the Marthoma Church), Volume 1 (2006), Volume II (2007), Volume III (2008). Pub. E.J.Institute, Thiruvalla.
Malankara Mar Thoma Syrian Church. His Grace the Most Rev Dr Philipose Mar Chrysostom, 2006.
Zac Varghese & Mathew A. Kallumpram. Glimpses of Mar Thoma Church History. London, England, 2003. .
 George C. Abraham. A Golden Tongue to Glorify his Master- Wit and Wisdom of Mar Chrysostom, Dawn India Books, Thiruvalla, India, 2002.

External links
 Official website of the Mathoma Syrian Church

Indian Christian religious leaders
1918 births
2021 deaths
Indian centenarians
Thirumeni
Malayali people
People from Pathanamthitta district
Christian clergy from Kerala
Recipients of the Padma Bhushan in other fields
Men centenarians